World Portuguese Language Day is observed annually on May 5. The day is marked through a range of musical performances, literature readings, competitions, cultural shows, art exhibitions, lectures, plays, and other cultural events worldwide in order to highlight the use and spread of the Portuguese language around the world.

The observance was established on July 20, 2009 by the Community of Portuguese Language Countries (CPLP) as Portuguese Language and Culture Day. The date of May 5 was chosen to coincide with the first meeting of the Ministers of Culture of the CPLP which occurred in 2005 and was subsequently declared . 

In November 2019, the 40th session of UNESCO's General Conference decided to proclaim May 5 of each year as "World Portuguese Language Day".

See also 
 International Mother Language Day
 International observance
 Official languages of the United Nations

References 

May observances
Portuguese
Portuguese language

Recurring events established in 2009
Community of Portuguese Language Countries